Spirochaeta is a genus of bacteria classified within the phylum Spirochaetota.

Phylogeny

Taxonomy
The currently accepted taxonomy is based on the List of Prokaryotic names with Standing in Nomenclature (LPSN) and National Center for Biotechnology Information (NCBI).

 Spirochaeta africana Zhilina et al. 1996
 Spirochaeta asiatica Zhilina et al. 1996
 Spirochaeta aurantia Vinzent 1926 ex Canale-Parola 1980
 Spirochaeta cellobiosiphila Breznak & Warnecke 2008
 Spirochaeta dissipatitropha Pikuta et al. 2009
 Spirochaeta halophila Greenberg & Canale-Parola 1977
 Spirochaeta isovalerica Harwood and Canale-Parola 1983
 Spirochaeta lutea Shivani et al. 2015
 Spirochaeta plicatilis ♦ Ehrenberg 1835 (type sp.)
 Spirochaeta psychrophila Miyazaki et al. 2014
 "Spirochaeta taiwanensis" Chi-Yu & Cai-Ji 2004
 Spirochaeta thermophila Aksenova et al. 1992
 Spirochaeta xylanolyticus Yeh & Huang 2004

Notes: 
♦ Type strain lost or not available

References

Spirochaetes
Gram-negative bacteria
Bacteria genera